Lee Pelty (4 May 1935 – 29 November 2009) was an American musical theatre actor, best known for his performances in numerous productions of Fiddler on the Roof, Man of La Mancha, 1776, and more.  Because of audience demand, Pelty most frequently appeared to sold-out crowds at the Old Candlelight Dinner Playhouse in Chicago.

Early life 
Born in Colon City, Panama as Isaac Lee Peltynovich (Pelty), he attended Purdue University as a member of the class of 1957.  In addition to his studies, Pelty sang with the Purdue University Varsity Men's Glee Club directed by an imaginative showman named Al Stewart.  Pelty's impressive successes with the Glee Club were the springboard for his professional musical career.  The Purdue Glee Club was internationally known as one of the best all-male college singing groups in the world and Pelty was its leading soloist and star attraction.  At about 6'4" and slender, he was an imposing talent with a magnificent voice. In each concert,  he appeared as a striking figure in the group's traditional concert attire of white tie and tails.  56 men, all students at Purdue and strictly amateur singers, were selected from hundreds of the best applicants each semester and became the "traveling/touring" Varsity Men's Glee Club.  Pelty was its most outstanding talent.  He had a powerful, melodious 2nd tenor voice with which, as a soloist with an amazing repertoire of classic songs from the 1920s through the 1950s, entertained thousands of fans in hundreds of concerts.  In each concert, Pelty always was asked to sing his very personal "Al Jolson Songbook."

One summer, the Glee Club sang in the Hollywood Bowl, The Grand Canyon's El Tovar Hotel, and Oklahoma's "Under The Stars."  Pelty was the main attraction everyone came to hear.  In another year, the Glee Club sang for President Eisenhower's Inauguration in Washington, DC.  Pelty captivated the audience with his talent.  In his singing career, Isaac Peltynovich (Lee Pelty) was, indeed, a star that burned brightly.

Career 
Beginning in 1971, he appeared as Tevye in four separate productions of Fiddler on the Roof. The first of these earned him The Joseph Jefferson Award. Over the course of his career, he performed the role of Tevye over 2,000 times.

Death 
Lee Pelty died at his Lincoln Park home on November 29, 2009, at age 74, after a battle with lung cancer.

References

External links 
 

2009 deaths
Male actors from Chicago
American male musical theatre actors
Deaths from cancer in Illinois
Deaths from lung cancer
1935 births
20th-century American singers
20th-century American male singers